Lois Grace Hall (August 22, 1926 – December 21, 2006) was an American actress.

Early years

Hall was born on August 22, 1926, in Grand Rapids, Minnesota, the daughter of Lois Grace (née Lambert), a teacher, and Ralph Stewart Hall, a businessman and inventor. She grew up initially in Pengilly, Minnesota, and later in California. While she was in high school, she began working with the stage crew at the Pasadena Playhouse. She eventually gained a scholarship there.

Career 
Hall's television appearances included Studio One, The Cisco Kid, Episode 112 of The Lone Ranger, Adventures of Superman, Highway Patrol, Marcus Welby, M.D., the penultimate episode of Little House on the Prairie and Star Trek: The Next Generation. She also guest-starred in TV series such as CSI, Cold Case, Six Feet Under, Nip/Tuck, and The Unit.

Hall's film debut came in Every Girl Should Be Married (1948). She also appeared in Love Happy (1949), My Blue Heaven (1950), Carrie (1952), Night Raiders (1952), Seven Brides for Seven Brothers (1954) in small roles, as well as in starring roles in pictures like Daughter of the Jungle (1949) and Pirates of the High Seas (1950). She is perhaps best known for her supporting role as Sister Constance in Kenneth Branagh's 1991 drama Dead Again. She was also seen in the hit films Gone in 60 Seconds (2000) and Flightplan (2005).

Personal life
In 1953, Hall married Maurice Willows, who died in 1995. She was a member of the Baháʼí Faith, visible giving talks on the religion  in 1951, and a long-serving secretary of the Local Spiritual Assembly of the Baháʼís of Los Angeles. She also worked with the Human Relations Council for the City of Los Angeles, planning cross-cultural events and helping arrange after-school tutoring and enrichment classes for at-risk young people.

Hall died in Beverly Hills, California, of a heart attack and stroke on December 21, 2006, aged 80. She was buried at Inglewood Park Cemetery next to her husband.

Partial filmography

 Family Honeymoon (1948) - Girl (uncredited)
 Every Girl Should Be Married (1948) - Girl (uncredited)
 Daughter of the Jungle (1949) - Ticoora
 Duke of Chicago (1949) - Helen Cunningham
 Roaring Westward (1949) - Susan Braden
 Love Happy (1949) - Young Woman (uncredited)
 Horsemen of the Sierras (1949) - Patty McGregor
 Adventures of Sir Galahad (1949 serial) - Lady of the Lake
 A Woman of Distinction' (1950) - Stewardess (uncredited)
 Kill the Umpire (1950) - Secretary (uncredited)
 Texas Dynamo (1950) - Julia Beck
 Rogues of Sherwood Forest (1950) - Pretty Girl (uncredited)
 The Petty Girl (1950) - Coca-Cola Petty Girl (uncredited)
 My Blue Heaven (1950) - Adoptive Mother (uncredited)
 Cherokee Uprising (1950) - Mary Lou Harrison
 Pirates of the High Seas (1950) - Carol Walsh
 Joe Palooka in the Squared Circle (1950) -Anne Howe Palooka
 Frontier Outpost (1950) - Alice Tanner
 Colorado Ambush (1951) - Janet Williams
 Cuban Fireball (1951) - Stewardess (uncredited)
 Blazing Bullets (1951) - Carol Roberts
 Secrets of Monte Carlo (1951) - Susan Reeves
 Slaughter Trail (1951) - Susan Wilson - School Teacher (uncredited)
 Close to My Heart (1951) - Young Mother (uncredited)
 Texas City (1952) - Lois Upton
 Night Raiders (1952) - Laura Davis
 Carrie (1952) - Lola (uncredited)
 The Congregation (1952)
 Here Come the Girls (1953) - Belle (uncredited)
 Seven Brides for Seven Brothers (1954) - Girl (uncredited)
 A Woman for All Men (1975) - Sarah / housekeeper
 Prime Risk (1985) - Dr. Holt
 Dead Again (1991) - Sister Constance
 Cuba Libre (1999) - Loretta
 Gone in 60 Seconds (2000) - Old Woman
 Bad Boy (2002) - Mrs. Wickman
 CSI: Crime Scene Investigation (2003 TV series) - Madeline Foster
 Lost (2004) - Old Woman
 Flightplan'' (2005) - Main Deck Grandma

References

External links

1926 births
2006 deaths
People from Grand Rapids, Minnesota
American Bahá'ís
American film actresses
Burials at Inglewood Park Cemetery
20th-century Bahá'ís
21st-century Bahá'ís
20th-century American actresses
21st-century American women